Köln Trimbornstraße is a railway station situated at Kalk, Cologne in the German state of North Rhine-Westphalia on the Sieg and East Rhine Railways. It was opened on 2 June 1991 on a railway that was originally built as part of the Deutz–Gießen railway on 1 January 1859.

Köln Trimbornstraße station is served by the S12 and S13 lines of the Rhine-Ruhr S-Bahn. Both lines operate towards Cologne at 20-minute intervals, so together they provide a 10-minute interval S-Bahn service to Cologne. It is also served by the S19 service between Düren and Au (Sieg), running hourly (substituting for an S13 service). It is classified by Deutsche Bahn as a category 5 station.

The KVB light rail station of Kalk Post is located within 200m walking distance from here.

References 

S12 (Rhine-Ruhr S-Bahn)
S13 (Rhine-Ruhr S-Bahn)
Railway stations in Cologne
Kalk, Cologne
Rhine-Ruhr S-Bahn stations
Railway stations in Germany opened in 1991